Al-Umal Sport Club, is an Iraqi football team based in Al-Iskan District, Baghdad, that plays in the Iraq Division Three.

History

Premier League Play Overview
Al-Umal was promoted to the Iraqi Premier League in first time in 1992–93 season, by a decision of the Iraq Football Association to replace Al-Tijara, which was excluded, after 46 games, adopting Al-Tijara's record at that point which was 10 wins, 18 draws, 18 losses, 39 goals scored, 55 goals conceded, 38 points. In the end, the team managed to finish the league in 18th place out of 24 teams, after gaining 59 points. In total, the team played in the Premier League for only three seasons, as it was relegated to the Iraq Division One at the end of the 1994–95 season.

Managerial history
 Saadoun Rashid Jabur 
 Shaker Salem
 Ali Hussein Yassin
 Karim Qumbel

Famous players
Nadhim Shaker

See also 
 1991–92 Iraq FA Cup
 2020–21 Iraq FA Cup

References

External links
 Iraq Clubs- Foundation Dates

Football clubs in Baghdad
Sport in Baghdad